Bassam Abou Hadid (born January 16, 1988) is an Egyptian professional footballer who currently plays as an attacking midfielder for the Egyptian club Ceramica Cleopatra FC. Abouhadid previously played for Ennpi, El-Entag El-Harby, El Raja SC, Al Hammam SC, and Ceramica Cleopatra FC.

References

1988 births
Living people
El Raja SC players
Egyptian footballers
Association football midfielders
ENPPI SC players
El Entag El Harby SC players